The Mainz University of Applied Sciences (German: Hochschule Mainz), is a 1971-founded university located in Mainz, Germany. The University of Applied Sciences Mainz consists of three faculties: School of Technology, School of Design and School of Business. The common feature of all fields of study is the practical orientation of the university, the short periods of study and the internationally orientated courses.
In 2009 the School of Business, the School of Engineering with the departments Geoinformatics and Surveying and the administration of the university moved to the new location "Campus". All other departments will move as well in the near future to the new location "Campus".

History and profile

The Mainz University of Applied Sciences stands in the long tradition of two educational institutions from the Electoral Mainz and the Grand Ducal Darmstadt.
On the one hand the craftsman drawing school founded 1841 in Mainz (1933 renamed in State School of Arts and Crafts, 1939 dissolved), whose origin can be seen in the 1757 founded Electoral Academy of Painting and Sculpture.
On the other hand, the Grand Ducal State Construction School founded in 1876 in Darmstadt (1933 renamed in the State Building School), in 1936 relocated from Darmstadt to Mainz as Adolf-Hitler-Building School.

After the Second World War, the Staatsbauschule und Landeskunstschule was officially reopened on October 3, 1946, in the Auditorium Maximum of Johannes Gutenberg University Mainz as the succession institution of the State Building School and the State School of Arts and Crafts.

In 1971 the University of Applied Sciences Rhineland-Palatinate was founded. In the year of 1996 the Mainz University of Applied Sciences was re-established as an independent university with three faculties: School of Engineering, School of Design and School of Business.

At the Mainz University of Applied Sciences a wide variety of study programs is offered, for example in architecture, civil engineering, geospatial and surveying, real estate project management, interior design, communication design, media design, technical building management, and economics (e.g. business management, international business, business law, career Integrating economics, economic computer science).

Teaching and Research

Degree Programs 

These study programs are divided into the three following faculties:
 School of Engineering
 School of Design
 School of Business

The faculties are also divided in separate courses  of  studies:

The faculty of Engineering offers:
 Architecture
 Civil Engineering
 Geoinformatics & Surveying

The faculty of Design offers:
 Communication Design
 Media Design
 Interior Architecture

The faculty of Business offers:
 Business administration & international business
 Business law
 Information management

At the time of summer semester 2008, all graduate programs at the University of Applied Sciences were converted on the Bologna Process to the international bachelor and master degrees.

Institutes at the Mainz University of Applied Sciences 

i3mainz

Institute for spatial information and surveying technology.

ai-mainz

Institute for Architecture Mainz.

iS-mainz

Institute for sandwich technology - Mainz.

Img

Institute for media design.

Design lab Gutenberg

Institute as an interface between research and teaching of communication design.

IUH

Institute for entrepreneurial action.

IFAMS

Institute for applied management science and social entrepreneurship.

FGKU

The Research Group Municipal and Environmental Economics (FGKU).

Faculties and departments

Location Campus Lucy-Hillebrand-Straße  (Bretzenheim)

 School of Engineering with the departments Geoinformatics and Surveying
 School of Business consisting of the departments business administration, business law and information management

Location Holzstraße  (city center)

 School of Technology with the departments Architecture, Civil Engineering
 School of Design with the departments Communication Design, Media Design and Interior Architecture

Services

Library

The library is currently situated at the two locations: Campus and Holzstraße. The libraries at these locations provide the media for each faculty situated there: economics at the location at Campus; engineering and design at the location Holzstraße.

The libraries provide books, journals, electronic media and videos for the each subject areas taught at the University of Applied Sciences. In addition, it offers daily and weekly newspapers, general reference books etc. The inventory is as a rule freely accessible to everyone. Exceptions are CDs, DVDs, videos, DIN standards.

AStA
The Mainz University of Applied Sciences has also an AStA.
The General Students' Committee (German: Allgemeiner Studierendenausschuss) or AStA, is the acting executive board and the external representing agency of the (constituted) student body at the Mainz University of Applied Sciences. It is therefore considered the student government and student representative organization. The AStA is separating in following sectors: administration, office, finance, executive board, university policy, international subjects, culture, light and sound, public relation, social matters, sport, traffic and directorate. They have an International Consultant for the special needs of foreign students. Furthermore, they offer social advice. The AStA also organize parties for the first year students and for the whole University.

See also

 Fachhochschule
 List of colleges and universities
 Mainz

References

External links
Mainz University of Applied Sciences 

 
1971 establishments in West Germany
Educational institutions established in 1971
Universities and colleges in Rhineland-Palatinate
Universities of Applied Sciences in Germany
Buildings and structures in Mainz
Organisations based in Mainz